In enzymology, an oligosaccharide 4-alpha-D-glucosyltransferase is an enzyme that catalyzes the chemical reaction in which the non-reducing terminal alpha-D-glucose residue is transferred from a 1,4-alpha-D-glucan to the 4-position of an alpha-D-glucan.  This enzyme is useful in hydrolyzing oligosaccharides.

This enzyme belongs to the family of glycosyltransferases, specifically the hexosyltransferases.  The systematic name of this enzyme class is 1,4-alpha-D-glucan:1,4-alpha-D-glucan 4-alpha-D-glucosyltransferase. Other names in common use include amylase III, and 1,4-alpha-glucan:1,4-alpha-glucan 4-alpha-glucosyltransferase.

References 

 
 

EC 2.4.1
Enzymes of unknown structure